Govinthan Karunakaran (born 1 October 1963), also known by the alias Jana, is a Sri Lankan Tamil politician, former provincial councillor and Member of Parliament.

Karunakaran was born on 1 October 1963. He was educated at Cheddipalayam Maha Vidyalayam and St. Michael's College National School. Following the Black July anti-Tamil riots he left school in August 1983 and in November 1983 he joined Tamil Eelam Liberation Organization (TELO), a Tamil militant group. He received Guerrilla warfare training and June 1987 became TELO's regional leader in Ampara District and Batticaloa District. Later he became general-secretary of TELO.

Karunakaran contested the 1989 parliamentary election as one of the ENDLF/EPRLF/TELO/TULF electoral alliance's candidates in Batticaloa District and was elected to the Parliament. He contested the 2012 provincial council election as one of the Tamil National Alliance (TNA) electoral alliance's candidates in Batticaloa District and was elected to the Eastern Provincial Council. Karunakaran and the other newly elected TNA provincial councillors took their oaths on 28 September 2012 in front of TNA leader and Member of Parliament R. Sampanthan.

Karunakaran contested the 2015 parliamentary election as one of the TNA's candidates in Batticaloa District but failed to get elected. He contested the 2020 parliamentary election as a TNA candidate in Batticaloa District and was re-elected to the Parliament of Sri Lanka.

References

1963 births
Alumni of St. Michael's College National School
Living people
Members of the 9th Parliament of Sri Lanka
Members of the 16th Parliament of Sri Lanka
Members of the Eastern Provincial Council
People from Eastern Province, Sri Lanka
Sri Lankan Hindus
Sri Lankan Tamil politicians
Tamil Eelam Liberation Organization politicians
Tamil National Alliance politicians